Casey Affleck is an American actor and director who has received numerous accolades throughout his career.

Affleck's breakthrough came in 2007, when he starred as the American outlaw Robert Ford in the Western drama The Assassination of Jesse James by the Coward Robert Ford, for which he received nominations for Best Supporting Actor at the Academy Awards, Golden Globe Awards, and Screen Actors Guild Awards. In the same year, he also had a leading role in his brother Ben Affleck's directorial debut Gone Baby Gone, that earned him a nomination for the Critics' Choice Movie Award for Best Acting Ensemble.

Affleck received universal acclaim for his portrayal of Lee Chandler, a grief-stricken alcoholic loner, in Kenneth Lonergan's drama film Manchester by the Sea (2016). His performance won him the Academy Award for Best Actor, as well as the corresponding prize at the British Academy Film Awards (BAFTA), Critics' Choice Movie Awards, and Golden Globe Awards.

Affleck has also directed the mockumentary I'm Still Here (2010) starring Joaquin Phoenix and the drama film Light of My Life (2019), the former of which was honored at the Venice Film Festival.

Major associations

Academy Awards

British Academy Film Awards

Critics' Choice Movie Awards

Golden Globe Awards

Screen Actors Guild Awards

Minor associations

AACTA International Awards

Chlotrudis Awards

Dorian Awards

Empire Awards

Gotham Awards

Hollywood Film Awards

Independent Spirit Awards

Irish Film and Television Awards

Jupiter Awards

MTV Movie & TV Awards

Sant Jordi Awards

Satellite Awards

Teen Choice Awards

Critics associations

Film festivals

Notes

References

External links
 
 www.caseyaffleck.com
 www.lightofmylife-film.com

Lists of awards received by American actor
Lists of awards received by film director